Her Adventurous Night is a 1946 American comedy film directed by John Rawlins and written by Jerry Warner. The film stars Dennis O'Keefe, Helen Walker, Scotty Beckett, Fuzzy Knight, Milburn Stone and Tom Powers. The film was released on June 5, 1946, by Universal Pictures.

Plot

Cast        
Dennis O'Keefe as Bill Fry
Helen Walker as Constance Fry
Scotty Beckett as Junior Fry
Fuzzy Knight as Cudgeons
Milburn Stone as Cop #1
Tom Powers as Dan Carter
Benny Bartlett as Horace
Charles Judels as Petrucci
Betty Compson as Miss Spencer

References

External links
 

1946 films
American comedy films
1946 comedy films
Universal Pictures films
Films directed by John Rawlins
American black-and-white films
1940s English-language films
1940s American films